This article lists important figures and events in Malaysian public affairs during the year 1970, together with births and deaths of notable Malaysians.

Incumbent political figures

Federal level
Yang di-Pertuan Agong:
Sultan Ismail Nasiruddin Shah of Terengganu (until 21 September)
Sultan Abdul Halim Muadzam Shah of Kedah (from 21 September)
Raja Permaisuri Agong:
Tengku Intan Zaharah of Terengganu (until 21 September)
Sultanah Bahiyah of Kedah (from 21 September)
Prime Minister:
Tunku Abdul Rahman Putra Al-Haj (until 22 September)
Tun Abdul Razak (from 22 September)
Deputy Prime Minister: Tun Dr Ismail (from 22 September)
 Lord President: Mohamed Azmi Mohamed

State level
 Sultan of Johor: Sultan Ismail
 Sultan of Kedah: Tengku Abdul Malik (Regent from 21 September)
 Sultan of Kelantan: Sultan Yahya Petra
 Raja of Perlis: Tuanku Syed Putra
 Sultan of Perak: Sultan Idris Shah II
 Sultan of Pahang: Sultan Abu Bakar
 Sultan of Selangor: Sultan Salahuddin Abdul Aziz Shah
 Sultan of Terengganu: Tengku Mahmud (Regent until 21 September)
 Yang di-Pertuan Besar of Negeri Sembilan: Tuanku Jaafar
 Yang di-Pertua Negeri (Governor) of Penang: Tun Syed Sheikh Barabakh
 Yang di-Pertua Negeri (Governor) of Malacca: Tun Haji Abdul Malek bin Yusuf
 Yang di-Pertua Negeri (Governor) of Sarawak: Tun Tuanku Bujang Tuanku Othman
 Yang di-Pertua Negeri (Governor) of Sabah: Tun Pengiran Ahmad Raffae

Events
1 January – New uniforms for police personnel and school pupils are introduced.
21 January – The National Consultative Council (NCC) established.
4 April – Malaysia's first satellite station was commissioned in Kuantan, Pahang.
6 August – Pahang state government declared and officially verified that the said Mat Siam was truly the legendary Pahang warrior, Mat Kilau, the son of Tok Gajah. However, on 10 August, he died due to old age.
31 August – Rukun Negara, the national ideology, was declared.
31 August – The first theme for National Day was Muhibah dan Perpaduan ("Goodwill and Unity").
31 August – Malaysia's national butterflies were recognized on a Malaysian stamp series.
7 September – The 50th anniversary of International Labour Organization was celebrated.
21 September – Tuanku Abdul Halim Muadzam Shah of Kedah was elected as the fifth Yang di-Pertuan Agong.
22 September – Tunku Abdul Rahman Putra Al-Haj resigned as prime minister.
22 September – Tun Abdul Razak became the new Prime Minister of Malaysia.
26 September – Tun Dr Ismail was appointed Deputy Prime Minister of Malaysia.
24 October – The 25th anniversary of United Nations was celebrated.
20 December – Fire broke out at Royal Selangor Club.

Births
 16 June – Rusdi Ramli – Malaysian actor and director
 30 August – Michael Wong – Malaysian Chinese singer
 5 December – Fauziah Latiff – Malaysian singer and actress

Deaths
3 January – Mustarjo – Malay film actor
24 May – Abdul Rahman Mohamed Yassin – 1st President of the Dewan Negara (1959-1968)
16 August – Mat Kilau – Famous Malay warrior in Pahang during British protectorate, allegedly aged 122 years (unverifiable in the absence of documentary evidence).

See also
 1970
 1969 in Malaysia | 1971 in Malaysia
 History of Malaysia

 
Years of the 20th century in Malaysia
Malaysia
Malaysia
1970s in Malaysia